This is a list of heads of state, government leaders, and other rulers in any given century.

3rd millennium
List of state leaders in the 21st century
Current state leaders
'23 – '22 – '21 – '20 – '19 – '18 – '17 – '16 – '15 – '14 – '13 – '12 – '11 – '10 – '09 – '08 – '07 – '06 – '05 – '04 – '03 – '02 – '01

2nd millennium
List of state leaders in the 20th century (1951–2000)
List of state leaders in the 20th century (1901–1950)
List of state leaders in 20th-century British South Asia

List of state leaders in the 19th century (1851–1900)
List of state leaders in the 19th century (1801–1850)
List of state leaders in the 19th-century Holy Roman Empire
List of state leaders in 19th-century British South Asia subsidiary states

List of state leaders in the 18th century
List of state leaders in the 18th-century Holy Roman Empire
List of state leaders in 18th-century British South Asia and its predecessor states

List of state leaders in the 17th century
List of state leaders in the 17th-century Holy Roman Empire
List of state leaders in 17th-century South Asia

List of state leaders in the 16th century
List of state leaders in the 16th-century Holy Roman Empire
List of state leaders in 16th-century South Asia

List of state leaders in the 15th century
List of state leaders in the 15th-century Holy Roman Empire
List of state leaders in 15th-century South Asia

List of state leaders in the 14th century
List of state leaders in the 14th-century Holy Roman Empire

List of state leaders in the 13th century
List of state leaders in the 13th-century Holy Roman Empire

List of state leaders in the 12th century
List of state leaders in the 12th-century Holy Roman Empire

List of state leaders in the 11th century
List of state leaders in the 11th-century Holy Roman Empire

1st millennium
List of state leaders in the 10th century
List of state leaders in the 10th-century Holy Roman Empire
List of state leaders in the 9th century
List of state leaders in the 8th century
List of state leaders in the 7th century
List of state leaders in the 6th century
List of state leaders in the 5th century
List of state leaders in the 4th century
List of state leaders in the 3rd century
List of state leaders in the 2nd century
List of state leaders in the 1st century

1st millennium BC
List of state leaders in the 1st century BC
List of state leaders in the 2nd century BC
List of state leaders in the 3rd century BC
List of state leaders in the 4th century BC
List of state leaders in the 5th century BC
List of state leaders in the 6th century BC
List of state leaders in the 7th century BC
List of state leaders in the 8th century BC
List of state leaders in the 9th century BC
List of state leaders in the 10th century BC

2nd millennium BC
List of state leaders in the 11th century BC
List of state leaders in the 12th century BC
List of state leaders in the 13th century BC
List of state leaders in the 14th century BC
List of state leaders in the 15th century BC
List of state leaders in the 16th century BC
List of state leaders in the 17th century BC
List of state leaders in the 18th century BC
List of state leaders in the 19th century BC
List of state leaders in the 20th century BC

3rd–4th millennium BC
List of state leaders in the 4th and 3rd millennia BC

See also
Lists of state leaders

 
Political timelines
Lists of years by topic